The 2022–23 Northwestern State Demons basketball team represent Northwestern State University in the 2022–23 NCAA Division I men's basketball season. The Demons, led by first-year head coach Corey Gipson, play their home games at Prather Coliseum in Natchitoches, Louisiana as members of the Southland Conference.

Preseason polls

Southland Conference Poll
The Southland Conference released its preseason poll on October 25, 2022. Receiving 92 votes overall, the Demons were picked to finish sixth in the conference.

Preseason All Conference
No Demons were selected as Preseason all conference members.

Roster

Schedule and results

|-
!colspan=12 style=| Non-conference regular season

|-
!colspan=12 style=| Southland regular season

|-
!colspan=12 style=| Southland Tournament

Sources

See also
2022–23 Northwestern State Lady Demons basketball team

References

Northwestern State Demons basketball seasons
Northwestern State Demons
Northwestern State Demons basketball
Northwestern State Demons basketball